Where the Bungalows Roam is the third album by Canadian singer-songwriter Jim Bryson, released 27 March 2007 on Kelp Records.

Track listing
All songs written by Jim Bryson, except as noted
 "Flowers"
 "If by the Bridge"
 "Pissing on Everything"
 "Clear the Crowds"
 "The Wishes Pile Up"
 "Fire Watch" (Bryson and Ken Babstock)
 "Don't Fail Me Now" (Sinkhole)
 "All the Fallen Leaves"
 "My Marie of the Sea"
 "Death by Vibration" (Miche Jette)
 "The Options"
 "Humling" (vinyl only)

References

External links
 WhereTheBungalowsRoam.com

2007 albums
Jim Bryson albums